Maureen Lee Storey, Ph.D., is the president and CEO of the Alliance for Potato Research and Education (APRE), founded in 2010. APRE is dedicated to expanding and translating research into science-based policy and education initiatives on the role of all forms of the potato in a well-balanced diet.  Regarding potatoes, she has said, "This industry has recognized that we need the science in order to fight back on the goodness, the deliciousness, the nutritiousness of the potato regardless of the form that it is being prepared in."

Storey received her bachelor of science, master of science and doctoral degrees from the University of Minnesota.  She also received a National Cancer Institute postdoctoral training grant at the University of Wisconsin-Madison.  She is a member of the American Society for Nutrition, the Institute for Food Technologists, and the Academy of Nutrition and Dietetics, formerly the American Dietetic Association.

Prior to APRE, Storey served as Senior Vice President, Science Policy for the American Beverage Association. From 2005 to 2007, she served as director of the Center for Food, Nutrition and Agriculture Policy (CFNAP), an independent, affiliated center of the College of Agriculture and Natural Resources at the University of Maryland-College Park. Storey also was an affiliate research professor for the university's Department of Nutrition and Food Science.  During 2005 - 2006, Storey served as interim director of the University of Maryland/U.S. Food and Drug Administration’s Joint Institute for Food Safety and Applied Nutrition (JIFSAN).

She formerly held posts as associate research professor and director of the Center for Food and Nutrition Policy at Virginia Polytechnic Institute and State University, and research assistant professor at Georgetown University. Earlier in her career, Storey worked at the Kellogg Company.

Storey has published numerous scientific papers on such topics as beverage consumption, children’s body mass index and regulatory considerations involving functional foods and nutraceuticals.  In 2009, she presented research at the Experimental Biology Annual Meeting regarding the increasing consumer preference in the United States for low- and no-calorie soft drinks. This research was based on the NHANES. Regarding this study, Storey said, "...consumers are beginning to take advantage of lower-calorie beverage options that can help in balancing energy from calories consumed with energy from calories burned through exercise."

Selected publications

References

External links
A story about lycopene in tomatoes in which Storey is quoted
An interview with Dr. Storey about high-fructose corn syrup

American food scientists
Living people
University of Minnesota alumni
University of Maryland, College Park faculty
Women food scientists
Year of birth missing (living people)
American women chief executives